Sheffield station, formerly Pond Street and later Sheffield Midland, is a combined railway station and tram stop in Sheffield, England; it is the busiest station in South Yorkshire. Adjacent is Sheffield station/Sheffield Hallam University Sheffield Supertram stop. In 2017–18, the station was the 43rd-busiest in the UK and the 15th-busiest outside London.

History

1870 - 1960

The station was opened in 1870 by the Midland Railway to the designs of the company architect John Holloway Sanders. It was the fifth and last station to be built in Sheffield city centre.

The station was built on the 'New Line', which ran between Grimesthorpe Junction, on the former Sheffield and Rotherham Railway, and Tapton Junction, just north of Chesterfield. This line replaced the Midland Railway's previous route, the 'old road', to London, which ran from Sheffield Wicker via Rotherham.

The new line and station were built despite some controversy and opposition locally. The Duke of Norfolk, who owned land in the area, insisted that the southern approach be in a tunnel and the land known as The Farm landscaped to prevent the line being seen. Some years later the tunnel was opened out into a cutting. Sheffield Corporation was so concerned about the eastern side of the city being cut off from the city centre that it insisted that public access be preserved across the railway site.

The station and Pond Street Goods Depot opened on a damp and cold day without any celebrations. There were originally different passenger entrances for each class. The original station buildings have been preserved and are between island platforms 2 to 5.

The station was given two extra platforms and a new frontage in 1905 at a cost of £215,000. The enlargements consisted of creating an island platform out of the old platform 1 and building a new platform 1 and a new entrance. These works were overseen by the Chief Architect to the Midland Railway Charles Trubshaw.

A large parcels office was built to the south of the main buildings. Two footbridges connected the platforms, the one to the north for passengers, the one to the south for station staff and parcels. The tracks were covered by two overall roofs. The older and larger spanned platforms 5 and 6, and an identical structure can still be viewed today at Bath Green Park railway station; the other platforms 1 and 2. Wartime damage put the roofs beyond economic repair; hence, they were removed in the autumn of 1956 and replaced by low-level awnings.

1960 - 2002
The 1960s saw the introduction of the Class 45 and Class 46 diesel-electric engines, known as Peaks. Sheaf House was built in 1965 adjacent to the station to house British Rail's Sheffield Division headquarters. As part of the reconstruction of the area as the "Gateway to Sheffield", it was demolished in early 2006. In 1970, Sheffield's other main station, Sheffield Victoria, was closed and its remaining services, from Penistone, were diverted until 1981 via a cumbersome reversal. The Pullman service between Sheffield Victoria and London King's Cross, including the morning and evening Master Cutler now ran onto the East Coast Main Line via Retford from Sheffield Midland instead. This was the third route used by the train of that name; originally it had run to London Marylebone. The station was resignalled in 1972, and its track layout remodelled. British Rail introduced the High Speed Train (HST) to Sheffield on the Midland Main Line in 1984. The cross-country services had seen the introduction of the HSTs in 1982. On 21 December 1991, the station was flooded by the River Sheaf, which flows under it. A log that was part of the debris commemorates the event on platform 5. In 1991. construction of the new Supertram network began and by late 1994 Sheffield Midland was connected to the network, after the opening of the line between Fitzalan Square in the city centre and Spring Lane, to the east of the station.

2002 - present

In 2002, Midland Mainline, as the main train operating company of the station, instigated a major regeneration of Sheffield station. Before this, a taxi rank was located inside what is now the main concourse and the new entrance hall. The stone façade of the station was sandblasted and its archways filled with unobstructed windows to improve views both from inside and out. Other changes included the improvement of platform surfaces and the addition of a pedestrian bridge connecting the station concourse with the Sheffield Supertram stop at the far side of the station.

To coincide with the regeneration of the station, Sheaf Square was rebuilt as part of a project designed to create the Gateway to Sheffield. The station and the square form part of a route that leads passengers through the square past the  Cutting Edge water feature, up Howard Street and into the Heart of the City. This Gateway to Sheffield won the Project of the Year Award in the 2006 National Rail Awards.

On 11 November 2007, East Midlands Trains, an amalgamation of Midland Mainline and part of Central Trains, took over the management of the station.

In December 2009, following the restoration of the station, a new pub, the Sheffield Tap, opened next to platform 1B. The room, located within the main station building, had been used as a store room for 35 years but was used for much longer as a bar and restaurant, catering for first class passengers since 1904. The bar has a restored early 20th century interior and offers a selection of quality cask ales and beers from around the world. Since opening, the bar has won the National Railway Heritage Award and the Cask Ale pub of the year award.

In October 2010, East Midland Trains initiated £10 million worth of improvements to its stations. Sheffield received renovated waiting rooms, toilet facilities and upgraded security systems amongst its improvements.
A new first class lounge on platform 5, part of these improvements, opened on 18 January 2011. The lounge was opened by the Master Cutler Professor Bill Speirs who was joined by 50 top business leaders from Sheffield and the surrounding area.

Station footbridge controversy

In 2008, East Midlands Trains revealed its intention to restrict access to parts of the station by installing ticket barriers to try to prevent passengers from travelling without a ticket. This proposal met with widespread opposition from residents and Council members because the footbridge would be closed off to non-ticket holders, severing a popular thoroughfare from the Norfolk Park residential area and the Supertram stop on one side, to the station travel centre, the bus interchange, the city centre and the city centre campus of Sheffield Hallam University on the other. On 6 May 2009, East Midlands Trains implemented its proposal, using temporary barriers and ticket inspectors to bar access to the footbridge to non-ticket holders, and local residents and Supertram passengers were forced to use longer routes around the station.

In November 2009, East Midlands Trains were refused planning permission for the barriers by the council, but in February 2010 announced it would apply again. Transport Secretary Lord Adonis announced in April 2010 that barriers would not be installed until a second bridge was built to maintain a thoroughfare for non-ticket holders.

From September 2010, East Midlands Trains used uniformed staff to prevent local residents using the footbridge. At the same time, Sheffield City Council explored the possibility of turning the bridge into a public right-of-way to resolve the matter. In late 2010, it was reported that the Deputy Prime Minister, Nick Clegg, MP for Sheffield Hallam, might intervene to resolve the impasse.

In March 2012, Transport Minister Justine Greening offered £3 million to build a new footbridge to resolve the problem.

Tickets are not currently required to enter the station or to use the footbridge, which gives access to the Sheffield Station tram stop to the east.

Future
Ian Yeowart, former Managing Director of Grand Central, put forward in 2009 a bid for new open access Alliance Rail Holdings services operating on the East Coast Main Line. As part of the scheme, four services a day would operate between Sheffield and London King's Cross via Alfreton, Nottingham and Grantham, meaning Sheffield would be connected to the capital by both the Midland Main Line and the East Coast Main Line routes once again. Yeowart has proposed the resurrection of the name GNER for the service, which has been unused since the last franchise of that name ended in 2007. However, in 2010 these proposed Sheffield to London Kings Cross services via the East Coast Main Line were rejected. In the 2010 Rail Utilisation Strategy, it quoted that the Midland Main Line north of Bedford will be electrified in 2020. The line is currently one of the few major main lines that is not electrified and the plan found that the project would provide significantly enhanced services and significant financial savings.
In July 2017 Transport Secretary, Chris Grayling, announced the electrification plan for the whole of the Midland Main Line would not go ahead as previously planned. Instead the section from Clay Cross in Derbyshire to Sheffield will be electrified by 2033 as part of the planned HS2. As an interim measure bi-mode trains, claimed to offer benefits similar to high speed electric trains were to be used. A National Audit Office report said: "In the case of Midland Main Line, bi-mode trains with the required speed and acceleration did not exist when the Secretary of State made his decision." The MP for Loughborough (another area to have been served by the proposed electrification scheme) and Chair of the Treasury Select Committee, Nicky Morgan said of the revised plans, "Now we see the decision to cancel it was based on fantasy trains that didn’t even exist and the Midlands being a guinea pig for an untested technology".

CrossCountry, aspiring to improve their overall network and services, aims to increase services between Sheffield and Leeds. East Midlands Railway also plans to make service improvements to its services between Liverpool and Norwich via Sheffield with two-car Class 158 trains doubling in capacity to four cars. Coupled with newly acquired Class 156 trains, this will lead to an extra 1,500 seats being available each day on this service. Northern, responsible for operating most local services in the Sheffield area, announced in August 2011 that extra services between Sheffield and Manchester Piccadilly would begin in December that year. The Hope Valley Line, which will see an extra service in each direction during the peak evening period, is a key commuter route and currently has a two-hour gap in its evening schedule, which will be filled by the new services.

As part of the HS2 plans, a new platform would need to be constructed which would provide additional capacity for HS2, which approved the new route via Sheffield in July 2017. Two trains per hour are to serve Sheffield on the new high speed line. The work for HS2 will see the footprint of the station expand and major reconfiguration of the tram and roads surrounding the station to accommodate the extra services.

Station Masters

Mr. Curtis 1870 - 1883 (formerly station master of Sheffield Wicker)
Henry Laister Wheen 1883 - 1905 (formerly station master at Bristol)
Shelton Chambers 1905 - 1911
John Lewis Shannon 1911 - 1914 (formerly station master at Nottingham, afterwards station master at Derby)
George Preston Hegges 1914 - 1933 (formerly station master at Cheltenham Lansdown Road)
Frederick G. Hewitt 1933 - 1937 (afterwards station master of Birmingham New Street)
F.C. O’Connor 1937 - 1938 (formerly station master at Northampton, afterwards station master at Preston)
Harry Dixon 1938 - 1952 (formerly station master at Southport)
E.E. Hannant 1952 (formerly station master at Leicester Central)

Station facilities
The main station entrance, facing Sheaf Square, is the location of the main concourse and most of the station's facilities. The ticket office, ticket machines, information desk and a number of retail units are located there, and public toilets and facilities such as cash machines. There are further shops and facilities on the island platforms and in the Supertram entrance hall at the far side of the station. There are waiting rooms on the island platforms and the East Midlands Railway first class lounge is within the station buildings, on platform 5.

There is a 678-space car park situated next to the main station building (Q Park) and there is a reserved parking area for blue badge holders in the main station building. There is also a taxi rank outside the station building, next to the disabled car park. Bicycle storage is provided on platforms 1a and 3a. The whole station, including platforms, concourse and Supertram stop, is accessible to disabled passengers.

Station layout

The station is divided into four parts: the main building/concourse and platforms 1a/1b; the first island with platforms 2a-5b; the second island with platforms 6a-8b; and the adjoining Supertram stop. All sections are connected by a large footbridge.

Sheffield station is designed to accommodate both through and terminating trains. Platforms 2c, 3, 4 and 7 can be used by terminating trains only.
The station has 9 platforms, numbered 1 to 8 and 2C. Platforms 1, 3 and 4 are divided into a and b sections to allow a brief stabling of terminating services before they are scheduled to depart. The station has four through roads which are used for through running or more commonly for stabling stock. Between platforms 5 and 6 these are known as "1-Up" and "2-Up" (they are on the "Up" or London-bound side of the station) whilst between platforms 1 and 2 are the "through road" with a direct path through the station or by a central crossover to the north end of platform 1 (1b), and "down station siding".

Prior to the 1972, multiple-aspect signalling (MAS) scheme, the southern half of the current platform 8 was called platform 9. Trains from the north from platform 9 could avoid trains stood at platform 8 via an additional through road.

The platforms are generally used as follows:

Platforms 1 and 2 - Northern for Huddersfield (via Barnsley and Penistone) and to Leeds via Barnsley (express): TransPennine Express for Cleethorpes via Doncaster: CrossCountry for Doncaster, Wakefield Westgate, Leeds, York, Newcastle,  Edinbugh, Glasgow Central & Aberdeen.
Platform 2C - Northern stopping services for Manchester Piccadilly via New Mills Central.
Platforms 3 and 4 - local stopping trains to Leeds (both routes), Lincoln, Adwick and Scarborough/Bridlington/Hull
Platform 5 - East Midlands Railway for London St Pancras for Derby, Norwich and Nottingham; CrossCountry for Derby, Birmingham, Reading, Bristol, Plymouth and Penzance.
Platform 6 - CrossCountry for Derby, Birmingham, Reading, Bristol, Plymouth and Penzance; Northern for Nottingham (via Alfreton), TransPennine Express to Liverpool Lime Street via Stockport and Manchester Piccadilly.
Platform 7 - East Midlands Railway for Norwich via Nottingham, Liverpool Lime Street & Manchester Piccadilly via Stockport; Northern stopping services for Manchester Piccadilly via New Mills Central.
Platform 8 - East Midlands Railway for Liverpool Lime Street & Manchester Piccadilly via Stockport: East Midlands Railway for London St Pancras via Derby; Northern for Nottingham via Alfreton; TransPennine Express for Liverpool Lime Street via Stockport & Manchester Piccadilly.

Supertram stop

Sheffield Station / Sheffield Hallam University stop on the Sheffield Supertram has direct interchange with Sheffield railway station. The station is built on top of a walled embankment high above platform 8 on the eastern side of the station; this embankment formerly carried Granville Street past the station, which was downgraded to a lineside public footpath when the embankment was repurposed to carry the Supertram line past the station in the early 1990s. In addition to the mainline station, the stop also serves the City Campus of Sheffield Hallam University and the Park Hill estate above the railway station.

The original stop opened in 1994 with the rest of the network. The original stop had three platforms - two on the northbound (inbound to the city centre) track, to allow for terminating Purple Route services prior to their extension to Cathedral in the city centre - and was connected to platform 6 of the main station by a simple staircase.

In line with the refurbishment of the rest of the station in the early 2000s, the tram stop was rebuilt in 2002 around 150 metres to the south of the existing platforms. As well as two new platforms, a ticket hall was constructed at the end of the main station footbridge over the top of platform 8, providing a direct connection from the tram stop to the station footbridge and the rest of the mainline station. Following the opening of the new stop, the old platforms were left in situ but have only ever been used in recent years in times of engineering works where additional platform space has been required.

Services

Trains per hour:

East Midlands Railway

Three named passenger trains (The Master Cutler, Sheffield Continental & South Yorkshireman) run on this service.
 1 to  via .
 1 to Liverpool Lime Street via Manchester Piccadilly.

CrossCountry

TransPennine Express

 1 to  via .

Northern Trains

 1 to Manchester Piccadilly via .
 1 to  via Chesterfield.
 1 to  via , three trains per week continue to  via .
 1 to  via , Barnsley and 

HS2 Services

HS2 will see a spur south of Chesterfield branch off the Main Route, which will go via the M18, allowing trains to head into a stop at Chesterfield and also head to Sheffield via the Sheffield to Leeds Line.

References and notes

External links

 Sheffield Train Station Information 
 Station history
 Parking at Sheffield Station
 Sheffield Station/Sheffield Hallam University
 Sheffield Supertram

Railway stations in Sheffield
Former Midland Railway stations
Railway stations in Great Britain opened in 1870
Railway stations served by CrossCountry
Railway stations served by East Midlands Railway
Northern franchise railway stations
Railway stations served by TransPennine Express
Sheffield Supertram stops
Grade II listed buildings in Sheffield
Charles Trubshaw railway stations
John Holloway Sanders railway stations
1870 establishments in England
DfT Category B stations